Pharma Nord is an international pharmaceutical company with corporate headquarters in Vejle, Denmark and manufacturing facility and research laboratories in Vojens, Denmark. Pharma Nord has 25 daughter companies throughout Europe, Asia, North America and the Middle East. Pharma Nord is a privately owned limited company.

History 
Pharma Nord was founded in 1981 by the two current owners, Eli Wallin and Sven Moesgaard, who established an import of a British selenium dietary supplement. Soon after, the product was further developed into the product sold today as Bio-Selenium+Zinc, which is still a cornerstone of Pharma Nord's product range. The commercial success of Bio-Selenium+Zinc paved the road for the first daughter companies that were established in Sweden, England and Finland.

In 1988, Pharma Nord (UK) was established to import products from Denmark to the UK market.

In 1990, Pharma Nord was the first company to introduce a coenzyme Q10 product, Bio-Quinone Q10, as a dietary supplement on the European market.

In June 2005, the first turf for a DKK 150 million  (USD 27 million) factory was cut by the Minister for Food, Agriculture and Fisheries Hans Christian Schmidt, expanding Pharma Nord's production facilities in Vojens, Jutland.

In 2007, Pharma Nord was ranked as number 286 of engineer-related businesses by the weekly newspaper Ingeniøren.

Pharma Nord products are currently retailed in more than 45 countries.

Business areas 
Pharma Nord develops, manufactures and markets dietary supplements, herbal remedies and medical drugs.

Pharma Nord's product range contains products in the following categories:
Vitamins
Minerals
Multivitamin and mineral products
Coenzyme Q10
Essential fatty acids
Herbal remedies
Beauty products
Slimming products
Medical drugs

Research and manufacturing 
Pharma Nord's products, both medical drugs and dietary supplements, are manufactured in accordance with the current Good Manufacturing Practice (GMP) and Hazard Analysis and Critical Control Points (HACCP) guidelines. The production of medical drugs is regulated by GMP, and dietary supplements are regulated by HACCP. Pharma Nord applies the strictest rules from either regulation in all aspects of production.

Pharma Nord's selenium dietary supplement SelenoPrecise is currently used in the Prevention of Cancer by Intervention with Selenium (PRECISE) study, a population study involving 40,000 test participants from Denmark, Sweden and England.

Pharma Nord's coenzyme Q10 preparation is the official reference product for the International Coenzyme Q10 Association (ICQA). Pharma Nord actively supports scientific research into the health benefits of coenzyme Q10, primarily in relation to cardiology. Q-Symbio, a large multinational study investigating coenzyme Q10's potential as an adjuvant for treating chronic heart failure was published in the Journal of the American College of Cardiology, HEART FAILURE. The Q-Symbio study randomised 420 patients with severe heart failure (New York Heart Association (NYHA) Class III or IV) to CoQ10 (ubiquinone) or placebo and followed each patient for a period of two years. In the group that received three 100 mg capsules of coenzyme Q10 daily there were 43% fewer heart-related deaths compared with the placebo group. Also, there was a significant reduction in the need for hospitalization among patients in the Q10 group. The product used in the Q-Symbio study was Pharma Nord's 100 mg Q10 in soft-gel capsules (Myoqinon). The preparation is based on ubiquinone, the form of CoQ10 that has been used in scientific research for over 50 years. Unlike ubiquinol (the reduced form of CoQ10), ubiquinone is the oxidized form of CoQ10 and must go through several steps by the body to convert it into the active ubiquinol.

See also
List of Danish companies
List of pharmaceutical companies

References 

Pharmaceutical companies of Denmark
Pharmaceutical companies established in 1981
Companies based in Vejle Municipality